KTRF-FM (94.1 FM, "The Falls") is a radio station broadcasting an Adult Hits format. Licensed to Red Lake Falls, Minnesota, it serves the Thief River Falls area. The station is owned by Thomas E. Ingstad.

External links

News and talk radio stations in the United States
Radio stations in Minnesota
Radio stations established in 2014
2014 establishments in Minnesota